Tamoor Sajjad (born 22 January 1992) is a Pakistani-born cricketer who plays for the Qatar national cricket team. He was named in Qatar's squad for the 2017 ICC World Cricket League Division Five tournament in South Africa. He played in Qatar's opening fixture, against the Cayman Islands, on 3 September 2017. He scored the most runs for Qatar in the tournament, with a total of 236 runs in five matches.

He made his Twenty20 International (T20I) debut for Qatar against Saudi Arabia on 21 January 2019 in the 2019 ACC Western Region T20 tournament.

In July 2019, he was named as the captain of Qatar's squad for the Regional Finals of the 2018–19 ICC T20 World Cup Asia Qualifier tournament. He finished the tournament as the leading run-scorer for Qatar, with 115 runs in four matches.

In September 2019, he was named in Qatar's squad for the 2019 Malaysia Cricket World Cup Challenge League A tournament.

References

External links
 

1992 births
Living people
Cricketers from Sialkot
Qatari cricketers
Qatar Twenty20 International cricketers
Pakistani emigrants to Qatar
Pakistani expatriates in Qatar